Stephanie Turner (born 25 May 1944) is an English actress. She is best known for the lead role of Inspector Jean Darblay in the first three series of the 1980s television BBC police drama Juliet Bravo (1980–82).

Turner was born in Bradford, West Riding of Yorkshire.

An early screen appearance was in Morning Story (1970), and she also played Dennis Waterman's screen wife, Alison Carter. In 1974 she appeared in an episode of Special Branch - also guest starring Dennis Waterman's on-screen sister. Turner also appeared in an early episode of The Sweeney (1975), and WPC Howarth in Z-Cars (1972–75), which stood her in good stead for her role as Inspector Darblay. 

She appeared in a 1975 episode of Public Eye as Julia Sissons, a 'missing' common-law wife-turned-barmaid. She also made an appearance in Whatever Happened To The Likely Lads and played a recurring role as Jessie Naylor, née Maugham, in Series 2 of Sam (1974). In the 1990s, she was in each episode of The Hello Girls as Miss Armitage, a supervisor of a 1950s GPO switchboard; and played Mrs Hope Q.C. in two episodes of At Home with the Braithwaites.

Having worked in various roles between the 1960s and 2000s on stage, on radio, on television and as a director, Turner retired from acting in 2010. In more recent years she has helped to direct drama students, had a share in an antiques business, and volunteered with InterAct Stroke Support (a charity that allows actors to read to patients following a stroke).

References

External links 
 

1944 births
Living people
British television actresses
Actresses from Yorkshire